Aktzin (alternate spellings: Aktsin, Aktsini, Aktziní) was the god of rain, thunder and lightning for the Totonac people in ancient Mexico.  Variants of this deity were known as Tláloc to the Aztecs and Chaac to the Mayas.

Aktzin was typically depicted as a male figure wearing some form of headdress and rings over his eyes, similar to spectacles.  In one hand he held a hammer or axe which would produce thunder and lightning as it struck the clouds.  Water poured from his other hand, either from his palm or from a vessel which he held.  These elements represented the life-giving and sometimes destructive forces of the weather.

The Spanish conquerors led by Hernán Cortés encountered this civilization in 1519 after their initial contact with the Mayas of the Yucatán Peninsula.  The Totonac territories were located near the Gulf coast in what is today the state of Veracruz.  See also Tajín (City of the Thunder God), an archaeological zone with the remains of the  Totonac capital city dating back over 1,000 years.

Mesoamerican mythology and religion
Mesoamerican deities
Sky and weather gods
Thunder gods
Rain deities
Totonac